KLWN (1320 AM and 101.7 FM) is a radio station broadcasting a News Talk Information format. It is licensed to Lawrence, Kansas, United States. The station is currently owned by Great Plains Media, Inc. and features programming from Fox News Radio, Westwood One and Fox Sports Radio.

The station also broadcasts University of Kansas football and basketball. KLWN is the flagship radio station of the Jayhawk IMG Sports Network. KLWN is also an affiliate of the Kansas City Royals and carries the entire NCAA Men's Division I Basketball Championship from Westwood One.

KLWN's FM counterpart is KKSW, which used to have the KLWN call letters and identified itself as "The Music Station, 106."

The stations were owned for years by Arden Booth, who also served as a Kansas State Senator. Booth had a five-minute daily poetry program called "Poetic License."  His son Hank served as general manager, morning news anchor and play-by-play voice of Lawrence High School football games.

Hank still calls LHS Football with Matt Llewellyn, while Nick Schwerdt and Craig Hershiser broadcast Free State High School Football game. Schwerdt, Derek Johnson and Hershiser additionally call local high school basketball.

The current local lineup consists of the KLWN Morning News Watch with John Flood and Tyler Jones from 6 to 8am, According to the Record with Hank Booth from 8 to 9am, Radio for Grownups with Joel Becker from 9am to noon, The Clark Howard Show from 12 to 3pm, and Rock Chalk Sports Talk with Nick Schwerdt and Derek Johnson from 3 to 6pm.

Weekend programming includes Thinking Out Loud with Tyler Jones from 7 to 10am on Saturdays and Lewis at Large with Warren Lewis from 7 to 8am on Sundays.

Personalities
Ed Abels, newscaster (1952–1955) was also host of Comments on Local Affairs.

References

External links
KLWN website

LWN
Radio stations established in 1951
1951 establishments in Kansas